Lilius is a Finnish family that descend from the bailiff Hans Rainenius (b. 1540), who lived in Satakunta. His son Vicar Henrik Rainenius-Lilius (1590–1657) together with his three sons where the first to adopt the surname Lilius.

Notable members 

 Henrik Lilius (1683–1745), Finnish poet :fi:Henrik Lilius
 Johan Lilius (1724–1803), Justice of the Hovrätt and founding member, with Henrik Gabriel Porthan, of the Aurora Society
Frans Hugo Lilius (1860–1936), Finnish senator, Minister of Justice
Frans Oskar Lilius (1871–1928), Finnish senator
 Albert Lilius (1873–1947), Finnish professor of psychology at Helsinki University, pioneer in developmental psychology
 Aleko Lilius (1890–1977), Finnish adventurer and author
 Carl-Gustaf Lilius (1928–1998), Finnish painter, sculptor and author, married to Irmelin Sandman Lilius  
 Henrik Lilius, (1939-) professor of art history at Helsinki University, professor of architectural history at Helsinki University of Technology and former head of The National Board of Antiquities 
Mikael Lilius (1949-), former president and CEO of the Finnish energy company Fortum

See also 

The National Biography of Finland
Swedish-speaking Finns

References

Finnish families
Latin-language surnames